The leaf blotch miner moth (Acrocercops brongniardella) is a moth of the family Gracillariidae. It is found in Europe, including Turkey. 

The wingspan is 8–10 mm The moth has dark brown forewings with a pure white pattern. The adults sit with their front legs stretched out to hold the head and thorax slanted up. The moths can be found in any month, probably in one extended brood.

Larva
The larvae feed on Quercus species including holm oak (Quercus ilex), feeding gregariously in the upper epidermis making conspicuous white blotches.

References

External links
 Lepiforum.de
 UK Moths
 

Acrocercops
Leaf miners
Moths described in 1798
Moths of Europe
Moths of Asia
Taxa named by Johan Christian Fabricius